Ryu Seung-ryong (born November 29, 1970) is a South Korean actor. Ryu began his acting career in theater, subsequently becoming one of the most versatile supporting actors in Korean film and television. In 2013, he headlined Miracle in Cell No. 7, which became (at the time) the third highest grossing Korean film of all time, and in 2019 he starred in the comedy film Extreme Job, which is currently the 2nd highest-grossing film of all time in South Korea. Ryu is the first Korean to star in four movies that have drawn over 10 million viewers each.

Career
Ryu Seung-ryong made his acting debut at the age of 15 in a stage musical. After his screen debut in 2004's Someone Special, he has since become one of the most versatile and dependable character actors in Korea. A sampling of the various roles he has played over the years: a mentally handicapped father in Miracle in Cell No. 7, the royal adviser Heo Gyun in Masquerade, an officer of the North Korean People's Army in The Front Line, a hard-nosed general of the Qing Dynasty in War of the Arrows, a ladies’ man in All About My Wife, a gambling husband who fears his wife in The Quiz Show Scandal, a refined gay man in Personal Taste, a vengeful gangster in Secret, a reporter on the trail of a story in The Recipe, and the titular figure in The Piper.

In 2017, Ryu was cast in the main role of Cho Hak-ju on the Netflix period zombie thriller Kingdom The series premiered on January 25, 2019.

In 2019, Ryu starred in the comedy film Extreme Job which became the 2nd highest-grossing film of all time in South Korea.

Personal life
Ryu graduated with a Theatre degree from Seoul Institute of the Arts. He currently teaches at Seoul Art College's School of Acting Arts as an adjunct professor.

Filmography

Film

Television series

Music video appearances

Theater

Awards and nominations

Listicles

References

External links
 
 Ryu Seung-ryong at Prain TPC 
 
 
 

20th-century South Korean male actors
21st-century South Korean male actors
South Korean male film actors
South Korean male stage actors
South Korean male television actors
1970 births
Living people
Seoul Institute of the Arts alumni
People from South Chungcheong Province
Grand Prize Paeksang Arts Award (Film) winners